Worcester State Hospital was a Massachusetts state mental hospital located in Worcester, Massachusetts. It is credited to the architectural firm of Weston & Rand. The hospital and surrounding associated historic structures are listed as Worcester Asylum and related buildings on the National Register of Historic Places.

It was once known as the Worcester Lunatic Asylum and the Bloomingdale Asylum. The hospital dates back to the 1830s. On January 12, 1833, the Worcester Insane Asylum opened. It was the first of its kind in the state. During the first year, 164 patients were received.

As the facility soon became overcrowded, superintendent Merrick Bemis called for the construction of a new asylum. A massive structure was to be laid out in the Kirkbride Plan and located on Belmont Street. Construction began in 1870 and the newly built Worcester State Hospital was completed in 1876 at the cost of well over a million dollars.

The wards were named after places in Massachusetts as well as numerous founders of the American Psychiatric Association, such as Howe, Appleton, Woodward, Gage, Hooper, Folsom, and Thayer.

History
In 1901 a satellite facility which became the Grafton State Hospital was opened in nearby Grafton, Massachusetts to give non-violent patients an opportunity to engage in therapeutic work in a rural environment.

During its operation, the hospital housed thousands of patients. In 1949, the daily operations of the facility were documented by Life magazine.

In 1958, the Bryan Building was added to relieve stress on the aging Kirkbride complex. Operations slowly transferred to Bryan until the original Kirkbride was abandoned in 1985.

In 1991, the Kirkbride suffered numerous fires which left the left wing destroyed and the right wing partially damaged. In 1992, the state declared the site "an effective total loss".

Current use and redevelopment
Although the facility was officially closed in 1991, operations still continued in the Bryan Building until 2012. In 2004 a proposal to build a new facility on this property was put into the works and called for all of the remaining newer and old building to be torn down.

Erecting the new hospital would take the place of both the current Westborough State Hospital, Taunton State Hospital, and the Bryan Building of Worcester State Hospital.

In 2008, there were plans to film Shutter Island on the grounds of the hospital. Because of the pending demolition of the facility, filming was not approved and instead the filming took place at Medfield State Hospital.

In 2008, the remaining buildings on the property with the exception of the Administration Block (with its notable clock tower), the Hooper Turret, and the Hale Building, were torn down. In the spring of 2009 construction on the new hospital began. Designed by Ellenzweig Associates the new facility is 428,000 square feet and LEED Gold Certified.

The new hospital, dubbed Worcester Recovery Center & Hospital (WRCH), was completed in October 2012 and has three recovery stages - House, Neighborhood, and Downtown, progressing as recovery increases. The facility has 260 adult beds, 30 adolescent inpatient beds and 30 adolescent intensive residential treatment beds. All patients in Bryan were transferred to the new complex within a month of the new facility's opening.

In 2015, the salvaged clock tower was transformed into a memorial, dedicated to the original Kirkbride building and the effect Worcester had on American Psychiatry.

In 2018, the former employee cottages were razed and plans to demolish the Bryan Building and Hale Buildings gained popularity in favor of a new biomedical campus.

Notable faculty
Andras Angyal, Psychiatrist in the research unit from 1937 to 1945.
David Shakow, Psychologist  in the research unit

See also
Worcester State Hospital Farmhouse
National Register of Historic Places listings in eastern Worcester, Massachusetts

References

External links
 . (Various documents).
 Kirkbride Buildings
 Photoessay on the 1877 Kirkbride complex
 WorcesterMass
 http://www.opacity.us/site56_worcester_state_hospital.htm
 The Coalition to Stop Institutional Violence records, 1972-1989 (bulk 1976-1981) are located in the Northeastern University Libraries, Archives and Special Collections Department, Boston, MA.
 http://www.asylumprojects.org/index.php?title=Worcester_State_Hospital

1876 establishments in Massachusetts
Psychiatric hospitals in Massachusetts
Demolished buildings and structures in Massachusetts
Government buildings on the National Register of Historic Places in Massachusetts
Hospitals established in 1876
Hospitals in Worcester, Massachusetts
Defunct hospitals in Massachusetts
Kirkbride Plan hospitals
Gothic Revival architecture in Massachusetts
Government buildings completed in 1876
Hospital buildings completed in 1876
National Register of Historic Places in Worcester, Massachusetts